Edward Quintal (1800 – 8 September 1841) was the first magistrate of the British Overseas Territory of Pitcairn Island. Quintal was the son of Matthew Quintal, the Bounty mutineer, and Teraura, the partner of Ned Young, and the future spouse of Thursday October Christian. The elder Quintal was killed by a hatchet the year before Edward was born.

Quintal was appointed elder by Joshua Hill in 1833, and he held the office of magistrate from 1838 to 1839. He was succeeded by his half-brother Arthur Quintal.

References

Pitcairn Islands people of Cornish descent
Pitcairn Islands people of Polynesian descent
Pitcairn Islands politicians
1800 births
1841 deaths